Kiss the Tears Away is the fifth album by Silly Wizard released in 1983 on the Highway Records label in the U.K. and on the Shanachie label in the U.S. This album introduces the song "The Queen of Argyle" and "Golden, Golden" written by Andy M. Stewart.

Track listing
"The Queen of Argyll (3:28)"
"Golden, Golden (3:55)"
"Finlay M. MacRae (3:34)"
"The Banks of the Lee (4:29)"
"Sweet Dublin Bay (3:31)"
"Mo Nighean Donn, Grádh Mo Chridhe (My brown haired maiden, love of my heart) (4:18)"
"Banks of the Bann (3:28)"
"The Greenfields of Glentown / The Galtee Reel / Bobby Casey's Number Two / Wing Commander Donald MacKenzie's Reel (4:39)"
"The Loch Tay Boat Song (5:03)"

Personnel
Phil Cunningham -  Accordion, synthesizers, piano, guitar, mandola, whistles, backing vocals
Johnny Cunningham -  Fiddle
Martin Hadden -  Bass, fretless bass, guitar, string synthesizer
Gordon Jones -  Guitar, bodhrán
Andy M. Stewart -  Lead vocals, tenor banjo

1983 albums
Silly Wizard albums